Annette Watts, née Culberson (born February 5, 1959), is an American high school basketball coach and the current head coach at Greeneville High School.  She was formerly a college basketball coach and the former women's head coach at Jacksonville State University in Jacksonville, Alabama. The JSU Gamecocks are members of the Ohio Valley Conference and compete in the NCAA's Division I.

Biography
The daughter of George and Geraldine Culberson, Annette is a native of Greene County, Tennessee and a 1977 graduate of West Greene High School. Attending East Tennessee State University on a basketball scholarship, she helped ETSU to a 54-54 record in her four years of playing guard for the Lady Bucs. She graduated from ETSU in 1981 with a Bachelor of Science degree, then continued in graduate school there, earning her master's degree in Secondary Math Education in 1985.  She married Mike Watts, a professional race car driver. 
Anette now works at Greeneville High School teaching math.

Coaching career
After graduating from ETSU, Annette began her coaching career at Greeneville (Tenn.) High school where she earned local Coach of the Year honors, taught for eight years, and directed the Lady Devils YMCA Basketball Camp for seven years. Relocating to Gainesville, Georgia, she taught and coached at Robert Wood Johnson Comprehensive High School, compiling a 125-51 in five seasons, being named local Coach of the Year three times, and also serving as director of the Lady Knight Basketball Camp from 1990 through 1995. Moving into the college coaching ranks for the first time, Annette spent 1997-99 as an assistant to Hall of Fame coach Kay Yow at North Carolina State University.  Annette then spent two seasons as head coach at Jackson County Comprehensive High School in Jefferson, Georgia, where she guided the Lady Panthers to the 2001 state quarterfinals and compiled an overall record of 38-20 and once more was named the local Coach of the Year. In 2001, Annette was named the head coach at Davidson College, where she became the winningest coach in that program's history. Her Davidson teams were 144-121 overall, 102-68 in the Southern Conference, and Annette was named the 2005 SoCon Coach of the Year.   After nine seasons, Annette resigned at Davidson and, on May 20, 2010, was named the head coach at Jacksonville State University. On June 4, 2013 it was announced that Annette has been named Head Girls Basketball Coach at Greeneville High School.

Head coaching record

References

1959 births
Living people
People from Greene County, Tennessee
People from Gainesville, Georgia
People from Jefferson, Georgia
Sportspeople from the Atlanta metropolitan area
Basketball players from Georgia (U.S. state)
American women's basketball players
East Tennessee State Buccaneers women's basketball players
Basketball coaches from Georgia (U.S. state)
American women's basketball coaches
High school basketball coaches in Tennessee
High school basketball coaches in Georgia (U.S. state)
NC State Wolfpack women's basketball coaches
Davidson Wildcats women's basketball coaches
Jacksonville State Gamecocks women's basketball coaches